Laberg or Laberget is a village in Salangen Municipality in Troms og Finnmark county, Norway. Laberget is located at the end of the Sagfjorden where the Sagelva river meets the fjord. The population (2001) of the village is 222.

References

Villages in Troms
Salangen
Populated places of Arctic Norway